Castellino may refer to:
Castellino del Biferno, a commune in Italy
Castellino Tanaro, a commune in Italy
Castellino Castello (1580–1649), Italian painter
Alexandre Castellino (1881–?), Swiss racing cyclist

See also
Castelino